Hua Rong is a fictional character in Water Margin, one of the Four Great Classical Novels of Chinese literature. Nicknamed "Little Li Guang", he ranks ninth among the 36 Heavenly Spirits, the first third of the 108 Stars of Destiny.

Background
The novel depicts Hua Rong as handsome-looking with red lips, sparkling white teeth, a narrow waist and broad shoulders. Deadly with his arrows, he is nicknamed "Little Li Guang" after the Han dynasty general Li Guang, whose skill in archery is legendary . Hua Rong serves as the garrison commandant of Qingfeng Fort (清風寨; in present-day Qingzhou, Shandong) under Liu Gao, the fort‘s governor, who in turn answers to the Qingzhou prefecture.

Battle of Qingfeng Fort 
Song Jiang flees Yuncheng County, his hometown, after killing his mistress Yan Poxi. He first takes refuge in the residence of nobleman Chai Jin, then the Kong Family Manor at Mount White Tiger, before moving to Hua Rong's house at Hua's invitation. Coming near to the Fort, he is caught by the bandits of Mount Qingfeng but befriends the three chiefs -- Yan Shun, Wang Ying and Zheng Tianshou --  when they learn he is the chivalrous hero Song Jiang. At the stronghold he convinces Wang to free a woman he has abducted with the intention to make her his wife. Song feels obliged to help because the woman is the wife of Liu Gao, the superior of Hua Rong.

Lantern Festival comes round. Song Jiang, who is then living in Hua Rong‘s house, goes outdoor that night to enjoy the lanterns. Mrs Liu spots him in the crowd and lies to her husband that Song has abducted and attempted to rape her at Mount Qingfeng. Believing his wife, Liu orders Song arrested and jailed. As Liu ignores his plea to release Song, Hua Rong breaks into his house and frees his friend. When Liu‘s men come to Hua Rong‘s house to re-arrest Song, Hua scares them away when he twice lives up to his boast of hitting targeted spots on the two door gods painted on his house's entry gate with arrows.

Battle of Qingfeng Fort
Liu Gao seeks help from Murong Yanda, the governor of Qingzhou (in present-day Shandong). Murong sends military officer Huang Xin to deal with the matter. Pretending to be a mediator, Huang lures Hua Rong to a feast where he captures the latter with an ambush. Meanwhile, Song Jiang has been seized by Liu's man as he fled to Mount Qingfeng to seek sanctuary. When Huang is escorting Song and Hua back to Qingzhou, the three outlaw chiefs of Mount Qingfeng intercept the convoy and save the two. They kill Liu but Huang gets away and holes himself up in Qingfeng Fort.

Murong Yanda sends commander Qin Ming to lead a military attack on the outlaws. Hua battles with Qin and lures him to fall into a pit. Qin is grateful to Song Jiang for not killing him when he is brought before the bandits. But he refuses to join them. After a night at the stronghold, Qin returns to Qingzhou to discover its suburbs razed with the residents killed. Murong accuses him from the top of the city's wall that he has led bandits to commit the carnage. To punish Qin, Murong has killed his family, including his wife. Qin could not make his way into the city. As he wonders aimlessly, he meets Song Jiang, Hua Rong and the bandits of Mount Qingfeng. He is then told the bloodbath is their work led by a man disguised as him. Qin is furious but is appeased after Song says he will arrange for Hua Rong's sister to marry him as compensation.

After defecting to the bandits, Qin Ming convinces Huang Xin to surrender Qingfeng Fort. The bandits capture Mrs Liu and kill her to avenge Song's ordeals.

Life at Liangshan

Expecting a bigger attack from Qingzhou,, Song Jiang suggests decamping to join the bandits at Liangshan Marsh. On the way, they come upon the duel between Lü Fang and Guo Sheng at Mount Mirror Image (or Mount Duiying). When the tassels of their ji weapons tangle together, Hua Rong separates them from afar with a shot.  Lü and Guo are stunned and come to befriend the group. They also ask to join Liangshan.

When the group arrive at Liangshan, the stronghold's chief Chao Gai is incredulous when told how Hua disentangled the knot at Mount Mirror Image. As the hosts take them on a tour around Liangshan, Hua Rong proposes proving his archery skill. He awes his hosts when he shoots down a pinpointed wild goose flying in a flock. Thereafter his shooting prowess serves Liangshan well in many battles. For example, he shoots down a lantern in the first offensive on the Zhu Family Manor, which is used at night by the enemy to signal the movement of intruders, thus enabling the Liangshan force to make a safe withdrawal. In the battle of Gaotangzhou, Hua kills an enemy officer with a shot.

Death
Hua Rong is appointed as one of the Eight Tiger Cub Vanguard Generals of the Liangshan cavalry in what is called the Grand Assembly. He participates in the campaigns against the Liao invaders and rebel forces on Song territory following amnesty from Emperor Huizong for Lianghshan.

Hua Rong survives all the campaigns and is appointed official of a prefecture. When he learns in his dream from the spirit of Song Jiang that the latter has died from poisoning by corrupt officials of the imperial court, he travels to Chuzhou (楚州; in present-day Huai'an, Jiangsu), where Song is buried. There he finds Wu Yong mourning at the grave. Hua convinces Wu that he could join him in suicide to meet Song Jiang in the other world, saying he has arranged for his family to have a decent life. They hang themselves from a tree next to Song's grave.

References
 
 
 
 
 
 
 

36 Heavenly Spirits
Chinese male archers
Fictional archers
Fictional characters from Shandong